This is a list of museums in Iran.

See also

 Tourism in Iran
 History of Iran
 Culture of Iran
 List of museums
 List of museums in Tehran

References

Museums
 
Museums
Iran
Museums
Iran